Maireana georgei, commonly known as slit-wing bluebush or satiny bluebush, is  a shrub species that is endemic to Australia. It grows to between 0.15 and 1 metre high.

References

georgei
Flora of the Northern Territory
Flora of South Australia
Flora of Victoria (Australia)
Eudicots of Western Australia
Flora of Queensland
Flora of New South Wales